Emily Noelle Skinner (born November 30, 2002) is an American actress. She is known for her work with the Brat network (2018–2020) and her role as Amber on the Disney Channel series Andi Mack (2017–2019).

Personal life
Skinner was born in Mission Viejo, and was raised in Trabuco Canyon. Her parents are Jennifer and Steve, and she has an older sister, Lauren.

She has supported and been involved in charity and activism, including the Make-A-Wish Foundation, Mattel Children's Hospital, Time's Up, and the March for Our Lives.

Career
Skinner began acting at the age of six, when she was enrolled into an acting class, and she later signed with Abrams Artists Agency. Her first role was in a 2009 episode of NUMB3RS.

In 2010, Skinner starred as one of the leads in short film Sodales, directed by Jessica Biel, which was a part of Glamour Magazine's "Reel Moments". She has also had several guest roles on television shows including Shake it Up, Days of Our Lives, CSI: Crime Scene Investigation, Austin & Ally, The Mindy Project, Sam & Cat, Criminal Minds, Rizzoli & Isles, and more. In 2015, she appeared in the music video for "Broken Arrows", an Avicii song. She starred in her first theatrical film, Blood Ransom, in 2014.

Skinner landed her first major role as Amber on the Disney Channel series Andi Mack, which premiered in 2017. She auditioned for the roles of Andi, Buffy, and Amber, and participated in a chemistry read with Peyton Elizabeth Lee and Asher Angel. In 2018, Skinner began working with the Brat network. Her roles include Diana in Total Eclipse and Chloe in Crown Lake. She has also made an appearance in the network's talk show, Brat Chat. In November 2018, she and Lilia Buckingham released a single, "Denim Jacket" and donated a portion of the proceeds to GLAAD. 

Skinner starred as Cindy Stallings in the 2019 dance film, Next Level. She appeared in another MarVista film Secrets in the Water as well as the Lifetime television film Saving My Daughter. She has upcoming roles in The Lies I Tell Myself, Something's More Than One Thing, and #FBF.

Filmography

Film

Television

Web

Music videos

References

External links
 

Living people
2002 births
21st-century American actresses
Actresses from California
American child actresses
American web series actresses
People from Mission Viejo, California